Nawaz Dad Khan (born on 5 August 1985) is a national boxer of Pakistan. He played many international matches and won medals. He also played the boxing at the 2010 Asian Games by Lightweight(60 kg).

See also 
 Pakistan at the 2010 Asian Games

References

External links 
 Kicked out from competition

1985 births
Living people
Pakistani male boxers
Lightweight boxers